Phil Veivers (born 25 May 1964) is a former Scotland international rugby league footballer. He is the brother of Australian international rugby league captain Greg Veivers.

Background

Veivers was born in Beaudesert, Queensland, Australia. His father, Jack, played rugby league for Souths and Queensland; his cousin, Mick Veivers, represented the Australia in the 1960s, and his cousin Tom Veivers played Test cricket for Australia.

Career
He moved to St. Helens the same time fellow Australian and Souths teammate Mal Meninga did, but where Meninga returned to his homeland Veivers stayed in England after marrying and having children, only returning to Australia for holidays and visiting his family. He was assistant to Brian Noble who was in charge of Bradford Bulls through their trophy days and continued partnership with Noble at Wigan.

In 1997, he represented Scotland in a match against France.

Veivers had a spell as caretaker manager at Salford when Shaun McRae was ill and was promoted from assistant coach to head coach in November 2011. He was sacked as head coach at Salford after four games in the 2013 Super League season.

After losing his job at Salford, Veivers served as assistant coach to the Exiles in the international origin series before finally landing a job at Workington Town in the Championship

County Cup Final appearances
Phil Veivers played  (replaced by interchange/substitute Roy Haggerty) in St. Helens 28-16 victory over Wigan in the 1984 Lancashire County Cup Final during the 1984–85 season at Central Park, Wigan on Sunday 28 October 1984, played , and scored 2-tries in the 24-14 victory over Rochdale Hornets in the 1991 Lancashire County Cup Final during the 1991–92 season at Wilderspool Stadium, Warrington on Sunday 20 October 1991, and played  (replaced by interchange/substitute xGus O'Donnell) in the 4-5 defeat by Wigan in the 1992 Lancashire County Cup Final during the 1992–93 season at Knowsley Road, St. Helens on Sunday 18 October 1992.

John Player Special Trophy Final appearances
Phil Veivers played  in St. Helens' 15-14 victory over Leeds in the 1987–88 John Player Special Trophy Final during the 1987–88 season at Central Park, Wigan on Saturday 9 January 1988.

References

External links
Saints Heritage Society profile

1964 births
Living people
Australian emigrants to England
Australian people of Scottish descent
Australian expatriate sportspeople in England
Australian rugby league coaches
Australian rugby league players
Huddersfield Giants coaches
Huddersfield Giants players
Rugby league fullbacks
Rugby league players from Queensland
Salford Red Devils coaches
Scotland national rugby league team players
Souths Logan Magpies players
St Helens R.F.C. players
Swinton Lions coaches
Phil
Workington Town coaches